Diego Romanini (born 30 December 1978 in Pietrasanta) is an Italian auto racing driver. He has competed in the World Touring Car Championship and was the Austria Formula 3 Cup champion in 2001 and 2003.

Career
After starting his career in karting, he first started circuit racing in 1998 with Italian Formula Renault, before racing in the Italian Formula Campus Series. In 2000 he competed in Austrian Formula Three, becoming champion in 2001. He spent one year in the British Formula 3 Championship, then returned to the Austrian series in 2003, where he regained his title. Also that year, he won the Centraleurop Formula Three Championship, and drove in the German Formula Three Championship. 2004 saw him first drive in Touring cars, with a season in the German Touring Car Challenge, finishing sixth on points. He competed in selected races in German Formula Three and the FIA GT Championship in 2005.

For 2006 he got a drive in the FIA World Touring Car Championship for the independent Wiechers-Sport Team, in a BMW 320i. He finished sixth in the Yokohama Independent Trophy, with a best placed race finish of thirteenth in round twelve at Puebla.

In 2008 Romanini raced in the International GT Open and selected rounds of the Euroseries 3000.

In 2011 Diego Romanini raced 5 VLN races and the 24h race at the Nürburgring Nordschleife with the BMW 325i E92 from Motorsport Team Sorg Rennsport. He took 3 VLN and the 24h victory in class!

Romamini will drive for Proteam Racing from the second round of the 2013 European Touring Car Cup season in Slovakia in a BMW 320si with the option of joining the team for future WTCC events.

Racing record

Complete World Touring Car Championship results
(key) (Races in bold indicate pole position) (Races in italics indicate fastest lap)

† Driver did not finish the race, but was classified as he completed over 90% of the race distance.

Complete International Superstars Series/EuroV8 Series results
(key) (Races in bold indicate pole position) (Races in italics indicate fastest lap)

† Driver did not finish the race, but was classified as he completed over 90% of the race distance.

Complete TCR International Series results
(key) (Races in bold indicate pole position) (Races in italics indicate fastest lap)

References

External links
 
 

1978 births
Living people
People from Pietrasanta
Italian racing drivers
Austrian Formula Three Championship drivers
British Formula Three Championship drivers
German Formula Three Championship drivers
Italian Formula Three Championship drivers
World Touring Car Championship drivers
FIA GT Championship drivers
24 Hours of Daytona drivers
Superstars Series drivers
European Le Mans Series drivers
24 Hours of Spa drivers
European Touring Car Championship drivers
European Touring Car Cup drivers
TCR International Series drivers
Sportspeople from the Province of Lucca
Nürburgring 24 Hours drivers